Martín Tonso (born 19 October 1989) is an Argentine professional footballer who plays as an attacking midfielder.

Career
Born in Gödeken, Argentina, Tonso joined Newell's Old Boys youth ranks. Promoted to first-adult team, he debuted in February 2011 against Lanús. However Tonso broke into first-team as right winger with Gerardo Martino as coach, where gained notoriety helping the club to win the 2013 Torneo Final.

Colo-Colo
On 21 January 2016, he joined Chilean giants Colo-Colo, being presented the same day alongside his compatriot Matías Zaldivia. In his debut he scored a goal against Peru's Universitario in a 3–3 exhibition match draw at Lima. His competitive debut came on 7 February during a goalless with Deportes Iquique and his first league goal was on 21 February against Unión La Calera, being the only one of the game. On 6 March, he scored his third league goal during the 170th derby between Colo-Colo and Universidad Católica.

Greece
On 2 September 2016, Atromitos officially announced the signing of Argentine attacking midfielder Martin Tonso, who signed a 1+1 season contract with the Greek Super League club for an undisclosed fee. On 30 June 2017, the club announced that they wouldn't exercise their right to renew Tonso's contract.

On 11 September 2017, he joined Asteras Tripolis. On 2 December 2018 he scored his first goal in a comfortable 4-0 home win against Kerkyra. On 4 March 2018, he scored in a dramatic 3-2 home win against PAOK. On 2 April he scored a brace in a 4-0 home win game against Platanias, helping his club in its effort to win a ticket to the next year's Europa League.

Despite leaving the club at the end of the season, on 3 September 2018 he returned and signed a new one-year contract. On 16 September 2018, he scored in an eventual 2-1 away loss against Olympiacos. On 2 December 2018, he opened the score in a 2-0 away win against Levadiakos. On 15 December 2018, Tonso was the MVP of a 2-1 home win against OFI, as he scored a brace and prolonged the team's winning streak to four straight games.

On 12 January 2019, he signed a contract with Aris, for an undisclosed fee. His first goal for the club came in an emphatic 5-0 home win against Apollon Smyrnis, on 18 March 2019.

Career statistics

Honours

Club
Newell's Old Boys
Primera División: 2013 Final

References

External links
 
 Martín Tonso at playmakerstats.com (English version of ceroacero.es)

1989 births
Living people
People from Caseros Department
Argentine people of Italian descent
Argentine footballers
Association football wingers
Argentine Primera División players
Newell's Old Boys footballers
Chilean Primera División players
Colo-Colo footballers
Deportes La Serena footballers
Super League Greece players
Atromitos F.C. players
Asteras Tripolis F.C. players
Aris Thessaloniki F.C. players
Serie C players
Vis Pesaro dal 1898 players
Argentine expatriate footballers
Expatriate footballers in Chile
Expatriate footballers in Greece
Expatriate footballers in Italy
Argentine expatriate sportspeople in Chile
Argentine expatriate sportspeople in Greece
Argentine expatriate sportspeople in Italy
Argentine expatriates in Chile
Argentine expatriates in Greece
Argentine expatriates in Italy
Sportspeople from Santa Fe Province